Peter Schiergen (born 23 March 1965 in Willich, West Germany) is a former German champion jockey and a Thoroughbred racehorse trainer.

Jockey 
Schiergen is the holder of the European winner-riding record.

After Hein Bollow, Peter Schiergen is the second member in the German "Club 1000" twice. 1000 ridden winners and 1000 trained winners.

Horse trainer 
 Schiergen trained Boreal, winner of the 2001 Coronation Cup.
 Schiergen had three starters in the 136th running of the Deutsches (German) Derby.
 Schiergen won his third German Derby in 2008, on Kasmin.
 Schiergen has several times been the German flat racing Champion Trainer 
 He trained Danedream, winner of the 2011 Prix de l'Arc de Triomphe.

References

German jockeys
German racehorse trainers
1965 births
Living people